Henrik L'Abée-Lund (born 26 March 1986) is a Norwegian biathlete. He has competed in the Biathlon World Cup since 2010–11 season. L'Abée-Lund has won a gold medal at the Biathlon World Championships 2013 (4 × 7.5 km relay).
He announced his retirement from Biathlon on May 3, 2019, citing his demotion to the B-team, family and lack of passion for the sport as the reasons.

References

External links 
 IBU profile

1986 births
Living people
Norwegian male biathletes
Biathlon World Championships medalists
Sportspeople from Trondheim